Ainārs Šlesers (born 22 January 1970, Riga) is a Latvian business oligarch and politician who was Deputy Prime Minister of Latvia, as well as Deputy Mayor of Riga. Currently he is a member of the Latvian Parliament with his political party, Latvia First, holding 9 seats in the parliament. In the 2022 elections, Slesers was the second highest supported politician among the voters.

Business Career

Šlesers started his business in Norway, becoming president of the Latvian Information and Commerce Center in Norway in 1992. Through joint ventures together with Frank Varner and Stein Erik Hagen, he opened numerous shopping centres as well as real estate and commercial properties in Latvia. During 1994–1998 he was director general at Norwegian retail chain "Varner Baltija" and Director General of "Varner Hakon Invest", both ventures of Varner-Gruppen. He also was Chairman of the Board and President of JSC Supermarket "Centrs" (1995–1998) and Director General of Rimi Baltija, Ltd (1996–1997).

Šlesers has been credited for bringing among the first foreign investors to Latvia. Through his joint ventures, he has opened and developed Rimi Baltic, Narvesen, Cubus, Bik Bok, Dressmann store chains; major shopping malls in Riga – Galerija Centrs, Mols, Dole, Alfa, Minsk, Origo and Olympia; hotels Radisson Blu Ridzene and Radisson Blu Latvija, as well as large real estate developments – Saules Akmens and Saliena.

Šlesers family are developers of Riga Port City. The 55ha development is the largest mixed-use waterfront project in Northern Europe. The project was originally developed by Dutch architect Rem Koolhaas. The area is expected to house the new Riga RoPax Terminal for passengers and ferries. It is expected to be completed by 2025.

Šlesers family also own and manage Riga Port AS with former Prime Minister Andris Šķēle. Riga Port AS is the leading port company in Latvia, having the largest coal and fertilizer terminals in the Baltics.

Political career
He was the leader of the LPP/LC and a Parliament Deputy of the 7th, 8th, 9th and 10th Saeima. He was also the Minister of Economics in the cabinet of Vilis Krištopans (1998–1999), Deputy Prime Minister in the cabinet of Einars Repše and Indulis Emsis (2002-2004), Minister of Transport in the cabinet of Indulis Emsis, Aigars Kalvītis and Ivars Godmanis (2004-2009) and Deputy Mayor of Riga in 2009–2010.

Minister of Transport
Šlesers was Minister of Transport and Communications from 2004 to 2009, while also serving as Deputy Prime Minister in Indulis Emsis Government. During these years, he is credited for developing the Riga International Airport into a regional hub, increasing the number of passengers tenfold. The crucial step in the development of the airport was the agreement between Šlesers and Ryanair CEO Michael O'Leary about entering the Riga Airport in 2005. At the same time, the Latvian government-owned airline airBaltic has steadily become the largest airline in the Baltics. Due to its fast-paced growth, the Riga Airport was included in the EU railway development project, Rail Baltica. With total investments exceeding 5,8 billion Euros, the project will offer convenient connections to the Baltic Capitals and to Western Europe.

Deputy Riga Mayor 
Šlesers took part in the Riga City Council elections in 2009 and received a majority of votes together with the Harmony Party and their leader Nils Ušakovs. Ušakovs became Mayor, while Šlesers became Deputy Mayor. Šlesers left office in 2010 after being elected in the parliament.

Latvia First 
In July 2021, Šlesers announced his return to politics and that he would be founding a new political party. The "Latvia First" party was formally founded on 14 August. In the October 2022 election, Šlesers and his party received 9 out of 100 seats in the parliament, and Slesers was ranked second highest supported politician in the election according to personal votes among voters.

Personal life

He is married to Inese Šlesere, former politician, with whom he has five children.

References

External links

Members of the Saeima since 1993

1970 births
Living people
Politicians from Riga
Businesspeople from Riga
New Party (Latvia) politicians
Latvia's First Party politicians
Latvia's First Party/Latvian Way politicians
Latvia First politicians
Ministers of Economics of Latvia
Transport ministers of Latvia
Deputies of the 7th Saeima
Deputies of the 8th Saeima
Deputies of the 9th Saeima
Deputies of the 10th Saeima
Deputies of the 14th Saeima
Spouses of politicians
Recipients of the Order of Prince Yaroslav the Wise, 3rd class